The 1959 edition of the Campeonato Carioca kicked off on July 12, 1959 and ended on December 20, 1959. It was organized by FMF (Federação Metropolitana de Futebol, or Metropolitan Football Federation). Twelve teams participated. Fluminense won the title for the 17th time. no teams were relegated.

System
The tournament would be disputed in a double round-robin format, with the team with the most points winning the title.

Championship

References

Campeonato Carioca seasons
Carioca